Arjantin Square is a square in north central Tehran. The area surrounding the square is referred to as Yousefabad although this is an incorrect title. The area around the large square is home to a collection of embassies, businesses, Medical labs, hospitals and the Arjantin Beihaghi Bus Terminal, which is central Tehran's main national bus terminal.

Notable Places
The area is also home to one of the largest supermarkets in Tehran called Shahrvand offering food and other products. It also includes one of Tehran's longest European style department stores called Hiland which is famous for cosmetics.

Just south of the square is Bucharest Street, which is famous for being the center of many banks and home to many embassies including the Japanese and Australian Embassy.

Squares in Tehran